The 1991 BC Lions finished in third place in the West Division with an 11–7 record. They appeared in the West Semi-Final.

Offseason

CFL Draft

Preseason

Regular season

Season standings

Season schedule

Awards and records
CFL's Most Outstanding Player Award – Doug Flutie (QB)
CFL's Most Outstanding Offensive Lineman Award – Jim Mills (OT) 
CFL's Most Outstanding Rookie Award – Jon Volpe (RB)
Jeff Nicklin Memorial Trophy – Doug Flutie (QB)

1991 CFL All-Stars
QB – Doug Flutie, CFL All-Star
SB – Matt Clark, CFL All-Star
WR – Ray Alexander, CFL All-Star
OG – Leo Groenewegen, CFL All-Star
OT – Jim Mills, CFL All-Star

Playoffs

West Semi-Final

References

BC Lions seasons
BC Lions
1991 in British Columbia